For the swimming competitions at the 2008 Olympics the following qualification systems were in place.

Pool: Individual Events
A National Olympic Committee (NOC) may enter up to 2 qualified athletes in each individual event if both meet the A standard, or 1 athlete per event if they meet the B standard. An NOC may also enter a maximum of 1 qualified relay team per event. NOCs may enter swimmers regardless of time (1 swimmer per sex) if they have no swimmers meeting qualifying B standard.

The qualifying time standards must be obtained in Continental Championships, National Olympic Trials or International Competitions approved by FINA in the period March 15, 2007 to July 15, 2008.

FINA Qualifying Standards are as follows:

Pool: Relays
The 2008 Olympics relay field consisted of 16 teams per event. These spots were allocated to:
the top 12 finishers at the 2007 World Aquatics Championships;
the fastest 4 teams not qualified via the 2007 Worlds, based on performances from April 2007-July 2008.

Men's 4×100 m freestyle relay

Men's 4×200 m freestyle relay

Men's 4×100 m medley relay

Women's 4×100 m freestyle relay

Women's 4×200 m freestyle relay

Women's 4×100 m medley relay

Open Water: Marathon
The 2008 Olympics mark the debut of an "open water" swimming even at the Olympics; for which a male and female 10-kilometer race was held at the Shunyi Olympic Rowing-Canoeing Park.

A nation could qualify up to two marathon swimmers per event, but only 25 swimmers competed in both the men's and women's 10-kilometer races. Those 25 spots were allocated/awarded as follows:

Men's 10 km

* The first eligible finisher from each of the five Continents at the 2008 Open Water World Championship.
** Since Australia was the only Oceanian country at the 2008 OW WC and the country had a qualifier in the top-10, Oceania did not receive any continental berth and the place redistributed to the Olympic Marathon Swim Qualifier for allocation.

Women's 10 km

* The first eligible finisher from each of the five continents at the 2008 Open Water World Championships. Basically the top finisher from each continent that was outside the top-10 finishers, and from a country who did not have a finisher in the top-10.
**Because South Africa was the only African country at the championships and they had Natalie du Toit qualify for the Olympics via her top-10 finish at the 2008 Open Water World Championships, the Africa continental berth was not allocated to the other South African entrant in the race. The entry allocation instead was added to those available for awarding at the Olympic Marathon Swim Qualifier.
***The Host Nation allocated entry was only if China did not have someone qualify in another fashion. China's Fang Yanqiao qualified at the 2008 Open Water World Championships via the Asia Continental Representative allocation, and therefore the Host Nation allocated spot became available at the Olympic Marathon Swim Qualifier.
****The Olympic committee of Israel did not approve the participation of Daniel Katzir (men) and Olga Berenseva (women) in the Olympic team, as their results were not good enough to make the national Olympic criteria. Their appeals to court against this decision were denied.

References

External links 
Beijing 2008 Olympic Games
Federation Internationale de Natation

Qualification
Qualification for the 2008 Summer Olympics
2008 in swimming